New Hampshire Route 43 is a  north–south state highway in southeastern New Hampshire which runs from Candia to Northwood.  The southern terminus of NH 43 is at an interchange with New Hampshire Route 101 in Candia.  The northern terminus is at an intersection with U.S. Route 4, U.S. Route 202 and New Hampshire Route 9 in Northwood.

Route description
NH 43 begins in Candia at exit 3 of NH 101.  The highway begins on Old Candia Road (which continues west of NH 101 as an unnumbered road) and proceeds north, intersecting with NH 27 before continuing into the town of Deerfield.  Upon entering Deerfield, NH 43 turns sharply east, then north again before meeting NH 107.  NH 43 and NH 107 form a concurrency of  through the town center, then NH 107 splits off northwest towards Epsom while NH 43 turns northeast towards Northwood.  NH 43 continues north and terminates at the split between US 4 and US 202 / NH 9 in Northwood.  

From the northern terminus of NH 43, one may go one of three ways.  To the left is the First New Hampshire Turnpike, which carries US 4, US 202, and NH 9 westbound towards Epsom and Concord.  Straight ahead is Rochester Road, which carries US 202 and NH 9 eastbound towards Barrington and Rochester.  To the right is US 4 eastbound (which becomes Old Turnpike Road upon crossing into Nottingham just to the east) towards Durham and Portsmouth.

Junction list

Further reading

References

External links

 New Hampshire State Route 43 on Flickr

043
Transportation in Rockingham County, New Hampshire